"A Broken Heart Can Mend" is a song written by Jimmy Jam and Terry Lewis and recorded by American recording artist Alexander O'Neal. It is the third single from O'Neal's self-titled debut studio album, Alexander O'Neal (1985). Following the moderately successful chart performances of the Alexander O'Neal singles "Innocent", and "If You Were Here Tonight", "A Broken Heart Can Mend" was released as the album's third single.

Release
Alexander O'Neal's third hit single reached No. 53 in the UK Singles Chart and No. 62 on the Billboard Hot R&B Singles chart in the US.

Track listing
 12-inch single (TA 6244)
"A Broken Heart Can Mend" — 3:40
"Innocent" — 10:34
"Are You the One" — 3:41

 7-inch single (ZS4 05646)
"A Broken Heart Can Mend" — 3:23
"Do You Wanna Like I Do" — 4:48

Chart performance

References

External links
 

1985 singles
1985 songs
Alexander O'Neal songs
Songs written by Jimmy Jam and Terry Lewis
Song recordings produced by Jimmy Jam and Terry Lewis
Tabu Records singles
Contemporary R&B ballads
1980s ballads